Babakina anadoni is a species of sea slug, an aeolid nudibranch in the family Babakinidae. 

The species was first described in 1979 and placed in the genus Rioselleolis but has subsequently been assigned to the genus Babakina. It is multicoloured and grows to 2 cm in length. The ground colour of its body is a shade of purple. Its chemosensory organs (rhinophores) and other structures covering the surface of the body (cerata) are contrasting shades of purple as well as different colours including blue, white, yellow and pink. This results in a very colourful animal.

It is found in warm sea waters, originally off the west coast of Spain, and also Portugal and France. It is also known from the eastern Atlantic in the Caribbean and coast of Brazil. Only a few individuals have been recorded. In 2022 an individual was found off the Isles of Scilly, surprisingly far north. 

The species was named to honour Emilio Anadón Frutos (1917-1997) who was a professor of zoology and marine biology at the University of Oviedo, Spain.

References 

Babakinidae
Gastropods described in 1979